The Zec des Martres is a "zone d'exploitation contrôlée" (controlled harvesting zone), in the unorganized territory of Lac-Pikauba, in Charlevoix Regional County Municipality, in the administrative region of Capitale-Nationale, Quebec, Canada.

The Zec is located in public lands. It is managed by the Association de plein air des Martres, which is a non-profit organization. The Zec has a mission to develop the land and make it available to the general public for outdoor activities including: hiking, quad/snowmobile, camping, hunting, fishing and watching scenery, flora and fauna.

Geography 
Founded in 1978, the Zec des Martres covers 424 square kilometers and includes 219 lakes. The Zec is entirely in forested area.

The Zec is bordered by the Laurentides Wildlife Reserve to the west; the Grands-Jardins National Park (Parc national des Grands-Jardins), to the south-west; the Municipality of Saint-Urbain, to the southeast of Zec du Lac-au-Sable, to the east; and the Hautes-Gorges-de-la-Rivière-Malbaie National Park to the north.

Route 381 linking Baie Saint-Paul to Saguenay runs more or less along the western boundary of the Zec . A segment of the road in the Hautes-Gorges crosses the eastern part of the Zec , in the north-south direction.

The Zec offers a hosting service at "Chalet de la Cheminée" (Villa of the Fireplace) and 17 campgrounds, all accessible by car. Many lakes in the Zec are equipped with a ramp to the water.

Toponymy 
The name "Zec des Martres" takes its name from Lac des Martres (Lake of Martens) which is the largest lake of the Zec . A marten is a carnivorous mammal with a long, supple body, a bushy tail and brown fur. In 1886, Lac des Martres was described by the land surveyor F. Vincent, who noted that it was surrounded by fir and spruce, and that there was trout in the lake.

The name "Zec des Martres" was formalized on August 5, 1982.

Features 
The main rivers of the Zec include:

 du Gouffre, 
 Malbaie
 Malbaie-Est
 Chouinard
 Porc-Épic
 des Érables
 Rivière Chemin des canots
 Ruisseau du Pont

Major lakes of the Zec are: 

 des Américains
 de la Baie
 Barley
 Beaulieu, 
 Belle Truite
 du Bouchon
 Boulianne
 de la Cabane
 Caribou
 des Cavernes
 du Coeur
 en Coeur
 du Coq
 Côte à Côte
 Croche
 à l'Écluse
 des Employés
 des Érables
 Équerre
 Évanturel
 Favre
 Froid
 Premier lac du Foulon
 Deuxième lac du Foulon
 Deuxième lac Paul
 Gabriel
 de la Galette
 du Gros Castor
 de la Grosse Femelle
 de la Hache
 Jérôme
 Lesclache
 Long
 Lunettes
 à la Main
 des Martres
 de la Mésange
 Nazaire
 Oscar
 du Pied des Monts
 Petit lac Barley
 Petit lac de la Baie
 Petit lac Barley
 Petit lac Long
 Petit lac Malfait
 Petit lac des Martres
 Petit lac de la Savane
 Petit lac Malbaie
 Pouliot
 Prime
 Resche
 Rétréci
 Rameau
 Robbé
 Rosa
 Tité
 du Tonnerre

See also 
 Lac-Pikauba, unorganized territory
 Charlevoix Regional County Municipality, (RCM)
 Capitale-Nationale, administrative region
 Petit lac Malbaie, a waterbody
 Petite rivière Malbaie, a river
 Malbaie River, a river
 Rivière du Gouffre, a river
 Grands-Jardins National Park (Parc national des Grands-Jardins)
 Laurentides Wildlife Reserve
 Hautes-Gorges-de-la-Rivière-Malbaie National Park (Parc national des Hautes-Gorges-de-la-Rivière-Malbaie)
 Zone d'exploitation contrôlée (Controlled harvesting zone) (ZEC)

References

External links 
  of Zec des Martres

Protected areas established in 1978
Protected areas of Capitale-Nationale